Bolney is a village and civil parish in the Mid Sussex district of West Sussex, England. The parish has a land area of 1479.41 hectares (3654 acres). In the 2001 census there were 1209 people living in 455 households of whom 576 were economically active. At the 2011 Census the population had increased to 1,366. Nearby towns include Burgess Hill to the southeast and Haywards Heath to the east.

The majority of the village sits between the A23 to the east, and the A272 to the south and consists of a main north/south road called The Street and towards the top of the village by Top Street, Cherry Lane and Ryecroft cutting east/west. Outside of this area the village extends south of the A272 down Bolney Chapel Road and to the East of the A23 in Crossways. The Bolney crossroads of the A23 and A272 has always been an accident black spot, and even with the building of the A23 flyover the area still has a high level of accidents and incidents on its stretch of the A23.

History
It is believed the name of the village came from the Saxon word “Bolne” meaning “a village (or high place) near marsh”, as the area is on high ground in an area that was marshy. Saxon road timbers have been excavated in The Street and there is a suggestion that this was an old route north into St Leonard's Forest.

In mediaeval times the village was noted for its cherry fair and iron smelting and until the early 20th Century a windmill existed on the Common.

At the heart of the village is St Mary Magdalene's Church, which partly dates from the 12th century.  The tower houses the first ring of eight bells in Sussex, the oldest dating to 1592.  At the top end of the village in Top Street there is another place of worship, the Bolney Village Chapel.

Historically the Village was in two parts the main village was clustered around the church and to the north there was the Common. House building up The Street during the 20th century joined these two parts together.

The last remaining pub in the village is called The Eight Bells in reference to the set of bells in the village church.

The village has a relatively high number of listed properties, with two main clusters at the south, around the church and to the north, in what was originally the Common.

Education
For pre-school education there is Bolney Under Fives Pre-School, for 2 to 5 year olds, and the Ark Nursery for 3 and 4 year olds, which follows the Early Years Curriculum.

Bolney Church of England Primary School serves 4–11 year olds. It was built in 1871 and has been expanded since, in 1996 and 2002.

Governance
Bolney was previously in the constituency of Arundel and South Downs which was created in 1997. It was represented by two MPs, Howard Flight (Conservative, 1997–2005) and Nick Herbert (Conservative, 2005) It moved into the Mid Sussex constituency in 2010, represented by Nicholas Soames (Conservative) until 2019. The MP since 2019 is Mims Davies.

Sport
Batchelor’s Field is the village's main recreation ground.

Bolney Cricket Club was founded in 1840. In 2003 a new pavilion was designed and built by players.
Bolney Rovers Football Club plays in the Mid Sussex Football League, and there is also a veterans' team for the over 37s.
Bolney Stoolball Club is a ladies' stoolball club that plays on Tuesday and Thursday evenings.

References

External links

Villages in West Sussex
Mid Sussex District